Karosa LC 736 is a long-distance coach produced by bus manufacturer Karosa from the Czech Republic, in the years 1984 to 1996. It was succeeded by Karosa LC 936 in 1996.

Construction features 
Karosa LC 736 is model of Karosa 700 series. LC 736 is unified with intercity bus models such as C 734 and B 732. Body is semi-self-supporting with frame and engine with manual gearbox is placed in the rear part. Only rear axle is propulsed. Front axle is independent, rear axle is solid. All axles are mounted on air suspension. On the right side are two doors. Inside are used high padded seats. Drivers cab is not separated from the rest of the vehicle.

Production and operation 
In the year 1984 started serial production, which continued until 1996.

Currently, number of Karosa LC 736 buses is decreasing, due to high age of buses.

Historical vehicles 
Private collections:
 Civic association for saving historic buses and trolleybuses Jihlava (1 bus)
 Historical Association Coach (1 bus)
 MDT Otvovice (1 bus LC 736.00)
 Unknown owner (LC 736.20 1 bus, license plate 1SA 9006)
 ČSAD buses Plzeň (1 bus LC 736.20)
 Private collector (1 bus LC 736.1030, license plate 5C5 1802)
 Busline (1 bus LC 736.1014, license plate SM 60-23)

See also 

 List of buses

Buses manufactured by Karosa
Buses of the Czech Republic